Austin Krajicek and Tennys Sandgren were the defending champions.

Krajicek and Sandgren defended their title, defeating Jarmere Jenkins and Bradley Klahn in the final, 7–6(7–2), 6–7(5–7), [10–5].

Seeds

Draw

References
 Main Draw

BNP Paribas de Nouvelle-Caledonie - Doubles
Internationaux de Nouvelle-Calédonie